John Cooke (7 March 1851 – 22 November 1908) was an English cricketer  who played for Derbyshire in 1874.

Cooke was born at Wirksworth and played cricket for Grimsby in 1873. He played one first-class game for  Derbyshire in the 1874 season in which he kept wicket in a victory against Kent. He was out for a duck in the first innings of the game, and scored six in the second. In the same season, he played in a non-first-class match for Derbyshire against Nottinghamshire when he kept wicket in the second innings and stumped two batsmen. He also played for Grimsby again in 1874. In 1878 he appeared for Birmingham.

Cooke died in Wirksworth at the age of 57.

References

1851 births
1908 deaths
English cricketers
Derbyshire cricketers
People from Wirksworth
Cricketers from Derbyshire
Wicket-keepers